Walter Roswell Kreinheder (September 8, 1901 – October 12, 1960) was an American football player. A native of Buffalo, New York, Kreinheder was a center for the Michigan Wolverines football team (playing as a substitute for All-American Ernie Vick) from 1920 to 1921.  He later played professional football for the Akron Pros, St. Louis All-Stars, and Cleveland Bulldogs from 1922 to 1925.  In 1923, he was selected as a first-team All-NFL player by Collyers Eye Magazine. He died in Texas in 1960.

See also
1920 Michigan Wolverines football team
1921 Michigan Wolverines football team

References

External links
Walt Kreinheder's NFL.com profile

Michigan Wolverines football players
Akron Pros players
St. Louis All-Stars players
Cleveland Bulldogs players
1901 births
1960 deaths